Marche is one of the twenty regions of Italy. The region is located in the central area of the country, and has a population of about 1.5 million people, being the thirteenth largest region in the country by number of inhabitants. The region's capital and largest city is Ancona.

The Marche region is bordered by Emilia-Romagna and the republic of San Marino to the north, Tuscany to the west, Umbria to the southwest, Abruzzo and Lazio to the south and the Adriatic Sea to the east. Except for river valleys and the often very narrow coastal strip, the land is hilly. A railway from Bologna to Brindisi, built in the 19th century, runs along the coast of the entire territory. Inland, the mountainous nature of the region, even today, allows relatively little travel north and south, except by twisting roads over the passes. 

From the Middle ages to the Renaissance period, many cities of the Marche were important cultural, artistic and commercial centres, the most prominent being Ancona, Pesaro, Urbino, Camerino and Ascoli Piceno.

Urbino, which was a major centre of Renaissance history, was also the birthplace of Raphael, one of the most important painters and architects of that period. The Marche region is also the birthplace of Gentile da Fabriano, Cyriacus of Ancona, Donato Bramante, Giovanni Battista Pergolesi, Giacomo Leopardi, Gioachino Rossini and Maria Montessori.

Toponymy 
The name of the region derives from the plural of the medieval word marca, meaning "march" or "mark" in the sense of border zone, originally referring to a borderland territory of the Holy Roman Empire, such as the March of Ancona and others pertaining to the ancient region. In English, the region is sometimes referred to as The Marches.

Geography 

The Umbrian enclave of Monte Ruperto (a subdivision of the Comune of Città di Castello) is entirely surrounded by the Province of Pesaro and Urbino, which constitutes the northern part of the region.

Most of the region is mountainous or hilly: the Apennine range runs longitudinally along the region's eastern border and descends through a hilly landscape towards the Adriatic sea. The hilly area covers two-thirds of the region and is intersected by wide gullies with numerous short rivers and by alluvial plains perpendicular to the Appennini range. The main mountain range has a few deep river gorges: the best known are those of the Furlo, the Rossa and the Frasassi.

Climate is temperate. Inland, in the mountainous areas, is more continental with cold and often snowy winters; by the sea is more mediterranean.

A region with an annular drainage pattern possibly corresponding to a mud diapir or astrobleme exists near Sant'Angelo in Pontano.

Mountains

History 

Marche was known in ancient times as the Picenum territory. The first period of cultural unity of the Marches was in the Iron Age, when the region was almost entirely inhabited by the Picentes. Many artefacts from their time are exhibited in National Archaeological Museum of the Marche Region in Ancona. In the fourth century BC, the northern area was occupied by the Senones, a tribe of Gauls. The Battle of Sentinum was fought in Marche in 295 BC; afterwards, the Romans founded numerous colonies in the area, connected to Rome by the Via Flaminia and the Via Salaria. Ascoli was a seat of Italic resistance during the Social War (91–87 BC).

Following the fall of the Western Roman Empire, the region was invaded by the Goths. After the Gothic War, it was part of the Byzantine Exarchate of Ravenna (Ancona, Fano, Pesaro, Rimini, and Senigallia forming the so-called Pentapolis). After the fall of the Exarchate, it was briefly in the possession of the Lombards, but was conquered by Charlemagne in the late eighth century. In the ninth to eleventh centuries, the marches of Camerino, Fermo and Ancona were created, hence the modern name.

Marche was nominally part of the Papal States, but most of the territory was under local lords, while the major cities ruled themselves as free communes. In the twelfth century, the commune of Ancona resisted both the imperial authority of Frederick Barbarossa and the Republic of Venice, and was a maritime republic on its own. An attempt to restore Papal suzerainty by Gil de Albornoz in the fourteenth century was short-lived.

During the Renaissance, the region was fought over by rival aristocratic families, such as the Malatesta of Rimini, Pesaro, Fano and the house of Montefeltro of Urbino. The last independent entity, the Duchy of Urbino, was dissolved in 1631, and from then on, Marche was firmly part of the Papal States except during the Napoleonic period. This saw the short-lived Republic of Ancona, in 1797–98; the merging of the region with the Roman Republic in 1798–99, and with the Kingdom of Italy from 1808 to 1813; and the short occupation by Joachim Murat in 1815. After Napoleon's defeat, Marche returned to Papal rule until 4 November 1860, when it was annexed to the unified Kingdom of Italy by a plebiscite.

The Bombardment of Ancona occurred during the Adriatic campaign of World War I. The Battle of Ancona occurred during the Italian campaign of World War II.

After the referendum of 2006, 7 municipalities of Montefeltro were detached from the Province of Pesaro and Urbino to join the Province of Rimini (Emilia-Romagna) on 15 August 2009. The municipalities are Casteldelci, Maiolo, Novafeltria, Pennabilli, San Leo, Sant'Agata Feltria and Talamello.

Towns in Marche were devastated by many powerful earthquakes during the centuries, the last time in 2016 (in August and in October).

In September 2022, Marche was hit by heavy flooding.

Economy 

Prior to the 1980s, Marche was considered a rather poor region, although economically stable in some sectors, thanks particularly to its agricultural output and to the contribution of traditional crafts.

Today the contribution of agriculture to the economy of the region is less significant and the gross value generated by this sector remains slightly above the national average. Marche has never suffered from the extremes of fragmented land ownership or 'latifondo'. Greatly diffused in the past, the sharecropping never produced an extreme land fragmentation. The main products are cereals, vegetables, animal products and grapes. Truffle hunting is popular; although it has often led to 'truffle wars' between hunters due to the imposition of quotas. Olives are also produced and managed by various harvesters. In spite of the marine impoverishment, the sea has always furnished a plentiful supply of fish, the main fishing centres being Ancona, San Benedetto del Tronto, Fano and Civitanova Marche.

Since the 1980s, the economy of the region has been radically transformed without, however, repudiating its rural past. Many of the small craft workshops scattered throughout the rural settlements have modernised and become small businesses, some of which have become major brands known all over the world (Indesit, Tod's, Guzzini, Teuco). This evolution led to the emergence of 'specialized' industrial areas, which are still profitable: 
 footwear and leather goods in a large area straddling the provinces of Macerata and Fermo; 
 furniture in the Pesaro area in particular; 
 household appliances and textile industry in the province of Ancona, in which the main engineering companies are also to be found (including ship building, petrochemicals and paper, as well as consumer durables). 
 The city of Castelfidardo remains an important centre for the production of musical instruments, the accordion in particular. 

The region continues to draw tourists, whose increasing numbers have been attracted by the rich and broadly distributed heritage of history and monuments, as well as by the traditional seaside resorts. Marche is well known for its shoemaking tradition, with fine and luxurious Italian footwear manufacturing facilities in the region.

The Gross domestic product (GDP) of the region was 43.3 billion euros in 2018, accounting for 2.5% of Italy's economic output. GDP per capita adjusted for purchasing power was 28,200 euros or 94% of the EU27 average in the same year. The GDP per employee was 96% of the EU average.

The unemployment rate stood at 7.4% in 2020.

Demographics 

The population density in the region is below the national average. It is highest in the province of Ancona ( inhabitants per km2), and lowest in the province of Macerata. Between 1952 and 1967 the population of the region decreased by 1.7% as a result of a negative migration balance, well above the national average, with a rate varying between 4.9 and 10.0 per 1,000 inhabitants. The Average fund of this region is worth about a few million or maybe higher. In the same period the natural balance of the population was positive, but lower than the national average and insufficient to counterbalance the net emigration. The population continued to decline until 1971, but in 1968 began growing again. In 2008, the Italian national institute of statistics (ISTAT) estimated that 115,299 foreign-born immigrants live in Marche, 7.4% of the total regional population.

Government and politics 

Marche forms, along with Emilia-Romagna, Tuscany and Umbria, the Italian "Red Quadrilateral", a strongly left-wing area. In the 2014 European elections, the people of Marche gave 45% of their votes to Matteo Renzi's Democratic Party.

As of the 2020 Marche regional election Marche is governed by the centre-right coalition.

Administrative divisions 
The region is divided into five provinces: Ancona, Ascoli Piceno, Fermo, Macerata, Pesaro e Urbino.

References

External links 

 
 Official Website of the Marche Regional Council 
 Photo gallery made by a UNESCO photographer.

 
NUTS 2 statistical regions of the European Union
Regions of Italy
Wine regions of Italy
Picenum